Alexander Kyle Sogard (born July 25, 1987) is an American baseball coach and former pitcher, who is the current head baseball coach of the Wright State Raiders. He played college baseball at Oregon State from 2006 to 2007 before transferring to NC State where he played for coach Elliott Avent from 2008 to 2010 before playing professionally for 6 seasons from 2010 to 2015.

Playing career

Amateur
Sogard attended Thunderbird High School in Phoenix, Arizona. Sogard played for the school's varsity baseball team all four years. As a senior, Sogard was a 2nd Team All-State pitcher and first baseman, behind Ike Davis. Sogard then enrolled at the Oregon State University, to play college baseball for the Oregon State Beavers baseball team.

At Oregon State, Sogard was a redshirt freshman when the Beavers won the 2006 College World Series. He pitched for Oregon State in 2007, as the Beavers won their second College World Series in as many years. Sogard then transferred to North Carolina State University, where he continued his college baseball career with the NC State Wolfpack. He was a starter and reliever during his 3 years at N.C. State.  Sogard was instrumental in the Wolfpack reaching the postseason in two of his three years there, including N.C. State's third Super Regional appearance in 2008. After the 2008 season, he played collegiate summer baseball with the Cotuit Kettleers of the Cape Cod Baseball League.

Professional
The Houston Astros selected Sogard in the 26th round of the 2010 MLB Draft.  Alex was also drafted by the Diamondbacks in 2008 but did not sign.  Sogard continued winning in pro ball as his Short Season Valley Cats won the N.Y. Penn League in 2010.  Alex continued his ascent through the Astros minor league system playing for a strong Lexington Legends team in 2011, AA Corpus Christi in 2012, and AAA Oklahoma City in 2013. After the 2013 season, they assigned him to the Arizona Fall League.

Sogard was traded to the Arizona Diamondbacks for Cesar Carrasco on July 7, 2014.

Sogard would play the 2015 season for the St. Paul Saints and the Wichita Wingnuts of the American Association of Independent Professional Baseball.

Coaching career
On August 9, 2016, Sogard began his coaching career as an assistant at Wright State University.

On July 6, 2018, Sogard was promoted to head coach of the Wright State Raiders.

Head coaching record

Personal life
Sogard is the son of Anna Vodicka Sogard & Bruce Sogard and the younger brother of Eric Sogard.

See also
 List of current NCAA Division I baseball coaches

References

External links

Wright State Raiders bio

Living people
1987 births
Baseball pitchers
Oregon State Beavers baseball players
NC State Wolfpack baseball players
Cotuit Kettleers players
Tri-City ValleyCats players
Lexington Legends players
Lancaster JetHawks players
Corpus Christi Hooks players
Mesa Solar Sox players
Oklahoma City RedHawks players
Peoria Javelinas players
Mobile BayBears players
St. Paul Saints players
Wichita Wingnuts players
Wright State Raiders baseball coaches
Baseball players from Phoenix, Arizona
Baseball coaches from Arizona